Lamanonia is a genus of trees in the family Cunoniaceae. It is endemic to South America.

It is found in north eastern Argentina, Brazil and Paraguay.

Species

The genus name of Lamanonia is in honour of Robert de Lamanon (1752–1787), a French botanist, physicist, geologist and meteorologist. 
It was first described and published in Fl. Flumin. on page 228 in 1829.

References

Cunoniaceae
Oxalidales genera
Plants described in 1829
Flora of Northeast Argentina
Flora of Brazil
Flora of Paraguay